Bhushan Patil (born 03 Jan 1996) is an Indian actor who appears in Marathi films

Career
Bhushan Patil known as the most versatile and promising fresh face of Marathi Film industry, he also known as Handsome hunk of M-Town Bhushan’s debut happened with the Balaji Telefilms Reality Show Kaun Jitega Bollywood Ka Ticket. Bhushan Patil was the winner of ETV Marathi reality show ‘Perfect Bachelor’ Bhushan Patil made his film debut with Marathi Film Olakh My Identity (2015) He has also done the music album with Sonu Kakkar, song – Akhiyan Nu Rehn De  and Isheta Sarckar – Pyaar Ka Hangover

Films

Music Albums
Sonu Kakkar, song – Akhiyan Nu Rehn De
Isheta Sarckar – Pyaar Ka Hangover

Media image

References

External links
 

1985 births
Living people
Indian male film actors
Marathi actors